Kaylee Bell is a New Zealand singer-songwriter. In 2013, she won the Toyota Star Maker award in Australia, joining the likes of Lee Kernaghan, Samantha McClymont and was the first New Zealand born artist since 1990 winner Keith Urban. She subsequently released her debut studio album, Heart First, later that year. Bell has placed multiple singles in the Top 10 of the Australian Country Music Charts and won multiple awards. She is currently the 'Most Streamed Female Country Artist' in Australia. Her second album, Silver Linings was released in November 2021. Bell opened for Brad Paisley on his World Tour NZ show late 2022 alongside Australian Country Star Morgan Evans and was support act for Ed Sheeran on his Mathematics World Tour in 2023.Career
Kaylee Bell was born in Waimate in Canterbury, New Zealand and began singing at the age of four. She won the NZ Gold Guitar Award at age 18 and moved to Australia four years later to pursue a career in country music. In 2013, she won the prestigious Toyota Star Maker award, which led to her releasing the single "Pieces" with fellow Australasian, Jared Porter. The song received substantial airplay in Australia and earned the duo an APRA Award for Best Country Music Song at the 2015 APRA Silver Scroll Awards and the overall grand prize at the US Unsigned Only Competition, marking the first time a non-American had won the latter award. Bell independently released her debut studio album, Heart First, in 2013 that included her first solo single of the same name. Heart First won Best Country Album at the 2014 New Zealand Music Awards.

In 2016 Bell released her breakout single "Getting Closer" a break-up anthem written with Morgan Evans, that charted on the New Zealand Heatseekers singles chart. Bell started reaching career highs on the Australia country music charts with the release of her singles "One More Shot", "Who I Am", "Keith", and "Wasted on You" in 2018 and 2019; these songs and "Getting Closer" were later repackaged as The Red EP in 2021.  Bell's tribute to Keith Urban, 'Keith' went to #1 on The Music Network Country Chart where it spent 25 weeks on the chart. Three further one-off singles were released in 2020: "Light On", "Home", and "Be With You". In 2021, Bell released three collaborative singles "That Summer" with Josh Mirenda or Lepnani, "Before I Met You" with The McClymonts, and "Living Free" with Lindsay Ell, and announced that her second studio album, Silver Linings, would be released November 26, 2021. 'That Summer' featuring Kiwi Pop Artist Lepani had crossover success at NZ mainstream radio in 2021 being 'the most added single to radio' for the month of May on hard hitters ZM, More Fm and The Hits.' Bell was chosen as the face for Spotify's EQUAL global programme for Female Artists in Music where she was featured on a billboard in Times Square, New York, USA.

In 2022, she auditioned for The Voice Australia and got all four Coaches to turn for her. After Keith Urban was blocked, she ultimately chose to be a part of Team Jess. She was eliminated in the battle rounds.

Discography
Studio albums

Extended plays

Singles

Notes

Awards
Tamworth Songwriters Awards
The Tamworth Songwriters Association (TSA) is an annual songwriting contest for original country songs, awarded in January at the Tamworth Country Music Festival. They commenced in 1986. Kaylee Bell has won one award.

|-
| 2010
| "The Seed" by Kaylee Bell and Lance Coassin
| Amateur Contemporary Award
| 
|-

Country Music Awards of Australia
The Country Music Awards of Australia is an annual awards night held in January during the Tamworth Country Music Festival. Celebrating recording excellence in the Australian country music industry. They commenced in 1973.
 

! 
|-
| rowspan="1"|  2022
| (unknown)
| (unknown)
| 
| rowspan="1"| 
|-
|rowspan="3"| 2023 || "Small Town" (with James Johnston) || Vocal Collaboration of the Year ||  ||rowspan="3"|  
|-
|rowspan="2"| Silver Linings'' || Contemporary Country Album of the Year || 
|-
| Album of the Year ||

Country Music Association Awards
The Country Music Association Awards (CMA) are an annual American awards show honouring the best in country music. Bell has received one nomination.
 (wins only)
|-
| 2022
| Kaylee Bell
| Global Country Artist Award
| 
|-

References

Living people
APRA Award winners
New Zealand country singers
People from Waimate
21st-century New Zealand women singers
Year of birth missing (living people)